Dahlenburg is a municipality in the district of Lüneburg, in Lower Saxony, Germany. Dahlenburg has a population of 3,449 (as of December 31, 2007).

Dahlenburg is also the seat of the Samtgemeinde ("collective municipality") Dahlenburg.

Twin towns
Le Molay-Littry, France

References